Longview station is a train station in Longview, Texas, United States. It is served by Amtrak and was originally built by the Texas & Pacific Railway.

The Longview station also serves as the train-bus transfer point for passengers destined to two Amtrak Thruway motorcoach routes. One route provides Texas Eagle connecting service to Nacogdoches, Houston and Galveston, Texas; the other route provides connecting nonstop service between Longview and Shreveport, Louisiana.

Opened in 1940, the red brick depot replaced an 1874 structure. Its Colonial Revival style, popular in the early 20th century, includes stylized quoins, brick cornice and grey stone trim used to highlight the coping, keystones and lintels. In its heyday, it ran several Missouri Pacific and Texas & Pacific trains a day, notably those companies' original Texas Eagle (ended, 1971), which west and south of Longview split into three different sections for different parts of Texas. Until 1963 the Louisiana Eagle went east to Shreveport and New Orleans. A successor night train and a successor day train ran on the route to New Orleans as late as 1968.

In early 2013, the city broke ground on a $2.2 million project to transform the depot into a multimodal transportation center. During the renovation, workers installed new dormers and the open-air waiting room was recreated. The project was largely funded through a Transportation Enhancement grant from the Federal Highway Administration, matched by city funds.

See also

Recorded Texas Historic Landmarks in Gregg County

References

External links

Longview, TX – Texas Eagle (Amtrak)
Longview Amtrak Station (USA Rail Guide -- Train Web)

Amtrak stations in Texas
Amtrak Thruway Motorcoach stations in Texas
Longview, Texas
Transportation in Gregg County, Texas
Buildings and structures in Gregg County, Texas
Railway stations in the United States opened in 1940
Recorded Texas Historic Landmarks